The 1996–97 Segunda Divisão season was the 63rd season of the competition and the 47th season of recognised third-tier football in Portugal.

Overview
The league was contested by 54 teams in 3 divisions with SCU Torreense, FC Maia and CD Nacional winning the respective divisional competitions and gaining promotion to the Liga de Honra.  The overall championship was won by FC Maia.

League standings

Segunda Divisão - Zona Norte

Segunda Divisão - Zona Centro

Segunda Divisão - Zona Sul

Footnotes

External links
 Portuguese Division Two «B» - footballzz.co.uk

Portuguese Third Division seasons
Port
3